Flying is the debut album by Swedish singer Jonathan Fagerlund. It was released in 2008 and resulted in two singles, "Angeline" and "Playing Me", with the latter reaching number 4 on Sverigetopplistan, the official Swedish Singles Chart.

Track listing

"Angeline"
"Playing Me"
"Mary Jane"
"Flying"
"Dance in the Shadows"
"Love Revolution"
"If I Can't Love You Anymore"
"Damn Lonely Night"
"Miss American Dream"
"Don't Wanna Live a Lie"
"A Little More"
"The Impossible Is Real"
"Father's Lullaby"

References

2008 debut albums
Jonathan Fagerlund albums